Pradeep Pandey "Chintu" is an Indian actor mainly active in Bhojpuri language films. In 2009 Pandey made his acting debut in the Bhojpuri film Deewana, for which he won the Juri Mention Award.

Early life and education
Pradeep Pandey was born on 9 December 1992 in Bombay city of Maharashtra. He is the son of filmmaker Rajkumar R. Pandey, who is known for his works mostly in Bhojpuri films.

Career
In 2009 Pandey made his acting debut in the Bhojpuri movie Deewana, for which he won the Juri Mention Award.

He is also known by the names "Chintu" and "Pradeep Pandey Chintu" in the Bhojpuri film industry.

Filmography

 All films are in Bhojpuri language unless otherwise noted.

References

External links
 

Living people
Male actors in Bhojpuri cinema
Male actors from Mumbai
Indian male film actors
21st-century Indian male actors
1992 births